Communication Quarterly is a peer-reviewed academic journal that is published five times a year by Routledge on behalf of the Eastern Communication Association. It covers research in the communication discipline. It was established in 1953 as Today's Speech, before obtaining its current title in 1976. The editor-in-chief is Chris R. Morse (Bryant University).

External links 
 
 Publications page at Eastern Communication Association website

Publications established in 1953
Routledge academic journals
Communication journals
English-language journals
5 times per year journals